Keon Kenroy Peters (born 24 February 1982) is a St Vincent-born cricketer who played in the Under-19 Cricket World Cup for the West Indies in 2000. He also played a number of first class matches for Windward Islands. He made his Test match debut for the West Indies against South Africa on 26 December 2014.

References

1982 births
Living people
West Indies Test cricketers
Windward Islands cricketers
Saint Vincent and the Grenadines cricketers
Saint Lucia Kings cricketers
West Indies B cricketers
People from Saint George Parish, Saint Vincent and the Grenadines
People from Charlotte Parish, Saint Vincent and the Grenadines